This is a list of members of the Western Australian Legislative Assembly between the 1936 election and the 1939 election, together known as the 16th Parliament.

Notes
 Two months into his term, the election of the Independent member for East Perth, Thomas Hughes, was declared void as he had been an undischarged bankrupt at the time of the poll. A by-election was called for 9 May 1936. Hughes, who had resolved his status in the interim, and the defeated member and former minister James Kenneally contested it, with Hughes once again securing the seat.
 On 13 May 1936, Albert Hawke was appointed Minister for Employment and Labour, as a result of Kenneally's defeat in East Perth. He was therefore required to resign and contest a ministerial by-election on 22 May 1936, at which he was returned unopposed.
 On 27 August 1936, Frederick Smith was appointed Minister for Justice and Railways in the new Willcock Ministry. He was therefore required to resign and contest a ministerial by-election on 4 September 1936, at which he was returned unopposed.
 On 4 January 1938, the Nationalist member for Sussex, Edmund Brockman, died. Nationalist candidate William Willmott won the resulting by-election on 12 February 1938.
 On 24 March 1938, Alexander Panton was appointed Minister for Health in the Willcock Ministry. He was therefore required to resign and contest a ministerial by-election on 9 April 1938, at which he was successful.
 On 12 March 1938, the Labor member for Hannans, Selby Munsie, died. Labor candidate David Leahy won the resulting by-election on 5 May 1938.

Sources
 
 

Members of Western Australian parliaments by term